The Stafford–Manchester line is a major railway line branching from the West Coast Main Line serving Stafford, Stone, Stoke-on-Trent, Kidsgrove, Congleton, Macclesfield, Cheadle Hulme, Stockport and Manchester.

Train services

Avanti West Coast
Avanti West Coast operate inter-city services between London Euston and Manchester Piccadilly, via the Colwich spur. Some services between London Euston and Manchester Piccadilly travel along the Stone to Colwich line, thereby by-passing Stafford.

CrossCountry
CrossCountry services operate between Birmingham New Street / The South and Manchester Piccadilly. Between Cheadle Hulme (where it joins the Crewe–Manchester line) and Manchester, the line forms part of Network Rail Route 20.

London Northwestern Railway
Local services between Stafford and Stoke-on-Trent, calling at Stone, are operated by West Midlands Trains; they are branded London Northwestern Railway,  as part of the London-Crewe service which started in December 2008.  Between 2004 and 2008, there was no stopping service on the route, with a replacement bus service taking its place. However Wedgwood and Barlaston stations are still without a train service, although they were never officially closed and are still served by rail-replacement bus services. Norton Bridge also lost its services at the same time but was formally closed in December 2017, after 13 years without a rail service.

Northern Trains
Frequent local services between Stoke-on-Trent and Manchester are operated by Northern Trains.

East Midlands Railway
The Derby to Crewe Line, operated by East Midlands Railway, shares the Stafford to Manchester Line between Stoke-on-Trent and Kidsgrove.

History
The line was completed in 1848. It incorporated the main line of the North Staffordshire Railway, from the junction with the London and North Western Railway at Norton Bridge, via its principal station at Stoke-on-Trent, to Macclesfield, where it made a running junction, again with the London and North Western Railway. The LNWR had its own station at Macclesfield Hibel Road, which was closed by British Rail in 1960.

The North Staffordshire Railway became part of the London, Midland and Scottish Railway in 1923.

Electrification
The line was electrified at 25 kV AC, using overhead wires under the BR 1955 Modernisation Plan.

References

Rail transport in Cheshire
Rail transport in Greater Manchester
Rail transport in Staffordshire
Rail transport in Stoke-on-Trent
Railway lines opened in 1848
Railway lines in the West Midlands (region)
Railway lines in North West England